The Cook Islands women's national rugby league team, also known as the Cook Islands Moana represents Cook Islands in Women's rugby league. The Cook Islands competed in the 2003 and 2017 Women's Rugby League World Cups. The Cook Islands have qualified for the 2021 Women's Rugby League World Cup which, after a delay due to the Covid-19 pandemic, is scheduled to be played in November 2022. The Cook Islands have prequalified for the 2025 Women's Rugby League World Cup.

History 
Cook Islands women's teams participated in the mid 1990s Oceania Cup tournaments in New Zealand. After appearing in the 1996 Oceania Cup, there was a gap in participation by Moana teams for several years until a revival in 2002 ahead of the 2003 World Cup. Invitational games were played against Maori and Niue teams. The squad for 2003 tournament were selected from New Zealand clubs. 

Cook Islands first World Cup appearance was at the 2003 Women's Rugby League World Cup. After a loss by a large margin in their opening fixture against New Zealand, Cook Islands won their second game against Tokelau. Fresh off byes in the last round of the first phase, and first round of the second phase, the Cook Islands held Great Britain to a 20-all draw. 

Cook Islands qualified for the 2017 Women's Rugby League World Cup by default after Fiji, Samoa and Tonga withdrew from the Pacific qualifying tournament due to a lack of players. After losses by large margins to New Zealand and Australia, the Cook Islands team had an upset victory over England.

Current squad 
The Cook Islands team for the postponed 2021 World Cup was announced on 6 October 2022. The team is coached by Anthony (Rusty) Matua

Notes:
 Kimiora Breayley-Nati has played 6 Internationals for New Zealand from 2017 to 2018. She played Nines for New Zealand in 2017 and for the Cook Islands in 2018. 
 Kiana Takairangi played 3 matches for the Cook Islands in the 2017 World Cup, and 2 matches for New Zealand in 2019. She played Nines for New Zealand in 2019.
 Elianna Walton played for Australia debuting in 2009, and participating in the 2013 and 2017 World Cups. In 2019, Walton played for Samoa.
 Chantay Kiria-Ratu, April Ngatupuna and Lavinia Kitai all played for Queensland Under 19's in June 2022.
 Mackenzie Wiki is the daughter of New Zealand Rugby League international Ruben Wiki.

Results

Full internationals

Tour / Trial / Warm-Up Matches

Nines

Recent Full Internationals in detail

England v. Cook Islands

New Zealand v. Cook Islands

Australia v. Cook Islands

Past Squads

2017 
Squad for the 2017 Women's Rugby League World Cup:

 Toka Natua (Tokoroa, NZ)
 Te Kura Ngata-Aerengamate (Counties-Manukau, NZ)
 Te Amohaere Ngat-Aerengamate (Counties-Manukau, NZ)
 Crystal George Tamarua (Auckland, NZ)
 Danielle Apaiana (Auckland, NZ)
 Stephanie Wilson (Sydney, Australia)
 Eliza Wilson (Auckland, NZ)
 Josina Singapu (Gold Coast, Australia)
 Karol Tanevesi (Sydney, Australia)
 Samaria Taia (Sydney, Australia)
 Natalee Tagavaitau (Auckland, NZ)
 Kaylen Ikitule (Auckland, NZ)
 Kiana Takairangi (Sydney, Australia)
 Chantelle Inangaro Schofield (Cook Islands)
 Beniamina Koiatu (Auckland, NZ)
 Inangaro Maraeara (Sydney, Australia)
 Manea Poa-Maoate (Wellington, NZ)
 Lydia Turua-Quedley (Melbourne, Australia)
 Ruahei Demant (Auckland, NZ)
 Cecelia Strickland (Perth, Australia)
 Urshla Kere (Brisbane, Australia)
 Kiritapu Demant (Auckland, NZ)
 Katelyn Arona (Christchurch, NZ)

2003 
Squad for the 2003 Women's Rugby League World Cup:

 Charmaine Angareu (Mangere East)
 Deborah Apaina (Ponsonby)
 Marry-Anne Aukino (Papakura)
 Rangi Aukino (Randwick)
 Justine Cook (Ponsonby)
 Sarah Cook (Ponsonby)
 Debbie Dorman (Ponsonby)
 Michelle Driscoll (Richmond)
 Tracey Larkin (Ponsonby)
 Elizabeth Mani (Mt Wellington)
 Caroline Marsters (Mt Wellington)
 Kelly Marsters (Te Atatu)
 Joyce Otikore-Joseph (Otara)
 Nora Pange (Mangere East)
 Api Parai (Te Atatu)
 Hilda Peters (Papakura)
 Karen Thorn (Ponsonby)
 Amiria Tikinau (Otahuhu)
 Mary Tuarae (Richmond)
 Tutai-Stephanie Utanga (Mt Wellington)
 Theresa Vaiula (Ponsonby)
 Teremoana Vano (Ponsonby)
 Teresa Wilson (Hillcrest)
 Tupou Wilson (Hillcrest)

See also

 Cook Islands national rugby league team
 Rugby league in the Cook Islands
 Cook Islands Rugby League Association
 Cook Islands national rugby league team results

References

External links

Women's national rugby league teams
Cook Islands national rugby league team